Sally Ann Jackson is an American scholar of argumentation, communication, and rhetoric.  She is a professor of communication at the University of Illinois at Urbana-Champaign.

Biography
Jackson earned all three of her degrees from the University of Illinois at Urbana-Champaign and has held faculty positions at the University of Nebraska-Lincoln (1979–1982), Michigan State University (1982–1985), University of Oklahoma (1985–1990), and the University of Arizona (1991–2007). At Arizona she also served in a series of administrative positions, including Vice Provost/Vice President for Learning and Information Technologies and Chief Information Officer. In 2007 she returned to the University of Illinois as a faculty member and Chief Information Officer of the campus. She resigned from the position of CIO in 2011 to protest administrative changes that she feared would harm the Urbana campus' status as a world leader in information technology  but remains a faculty member.

The central theme in Professor Jackson's work has been communication design, with specific interests ranging from the natural design of argumentation to highly engineered systems for managing complex human activities. Her work has appeared in Communication Monographs, Communication Theory, Journal of the American Forensic Association, Quarterly Journal of Speech, and Argumentation, among other journals. She has written or co-authored three books.

Selected awards
from the National Communication Association:
Charles Woolbert Research Award, 1995
Golden Anniversary Monograph Award, 1981
Outstanding Scholarship Award, Language and Social Interaction Division, 2005
from the American Forensic Association:
Daniel Rohrer Memorial Research Award, 1993
from the International Society for the Study of Argumentation:
Distinguished Scholar Award, 1997

Selected works
Selected works:
Aakhus, M., & Jackson, S. (2005). Technology, design, and interaction. In K. Fitch & R. E. Sanders (eds)., Handbook of Language and Social Interaction", (pp. 411-436). Mahwah, NJ: Erlbaum.
Jackson, S., & Brashers, D. E. (1994). Random Factors in ANOVA, Quantitative Applications in the Social Sciences . Newbury Park, CA: Sage.
Jackson, S., & Wolski, S. (2001). Identification of and adaptation to students' preinstructional beliefs in introductory communication research methods: Contributions of interactive web technology. Communication Education, 50, 189–205.
Eemeren, F. H. van, Grootendorst, R., Jackson, S., & Jacobs, S. (1993). Reconstructing Argumentative Discourse. Tuscaloosa, AL: University of Alabama.
Jackson, S. (1992).Message Effects Research: Principles of design and analysis''. New York: Guilford.

References

Year of birth missing (living people)
Living people
University of Illinois Urbana-Champaign alumni
University of Arizona faculty
Communication theorists
American women non-fiction writers
University of Illinois Urbana-Champaign faculty
American women academics
21st-century American women